Katja Mast (born 4 February 1971) is a German politician of the SPD who has been serving as a member of the Bundestag from the state of Baden-Württemberg since 2005.

Political career 
Mast became a member of the Bundestag in the 2005 German federal election. She is a member of the Mediation Committee. From 2017 until 2021, she served as one of her parliamentary group's deputy chairpersons, under the leadership of successive chairs Andrea Nahles (2017–2019) and Rolf Mützenich (2019–2021). Since 2022, Mast has been serving on the Committee on the Election of Judges (Wahlausschuss), which is in charge of appointing judges to the Federal Constitutional Court of Germany.

In the negotiations to form a so-called traffic light coalition of the SPD, the Green Party and the Free Democrats (FDP) following the 2021 German elections, Mast was part of her party's delegation in the working group on social policy, co-chaired by Dagmar Schmidt, Sven Lehmann and Johannes Vogel.

References

External links 

  
 Bundestag biography 

1971 births
Living people
Members of the Bundestag for Baden-Württemberg
Female members of the Bundestag
21st-century German women politicians
Members of the Bundestag 2021–2025
Members of the Bundestag 2017–2021
Members of the Bundestag 2013–2017
Members of the Bundestag 2009–2013
Members of the Bundestag 2005–2009
Members of the Bundestag for the Social Democratic Party of Germany